Amauju is an autonomous community of Imo State in southeastern Nigeria. The town is part of Imo State's Isu Local Government Area, zoned to Orlu Senatorial Zone.

The people of Amauju are of the Nigerian Ibo ethnic group, and speak the Igbo language. The town was formerly part of Isunjaba autonomous community before Amauju attained the requirements that elevated it to the status of an autonomous community and people are just starting to know it as a competent town.

Amauju is situated in the middle of towns. Among close towns are Eziama, Amaigbo, Nkwerre, Owerre Nkworji, Amucha, Umundugba, Ekwe, and others. They all share the same cultural value and belief system. The annual highlight in the town is the Masquerade Ceremony (Okorosha). This ceremony often sees the return of those that hails from Amauju and its surroundings. The Masquerade Ceremony serves as a reunion for the people of Amauju and beyond, and it is also an appreciation to the cultural and ethnic value of our people. Other festivals we celebrate includes the New Yam Festival of the Ibo Land, the women dance group (Udodiri), and the annual August meeting. Amauju has an annual magazine publication called Ishi Ehi.

Some of the villages in Amauju autonomous community include Umunaa, Umuokwararo, Umulolo, Umujika, Umunwebele, Umuezealauko and Umuezeiyi.

Among the prominent people that hail from Amauju includes Late Honorable Chief Emmanuel C. Ikemezie, who is credited with laying the foundation for the realization of the Amauju Autonomous Community.

Populated places in Imo State